The 482d Attack Squadron is a United States Air Force unit, stationed at Shaw Air Force Base, South Carolina, where it is an operational squadron of the 25th Attack Group, operating the General Atomics MQ-9 Reaper unmanned aerial vehicle.

The first predecessor of the squadron was organized in 1917 as the 70th Aero Squadron.  After being redesignated as the 482d Aero Squadron, it deployed to France as a construction unit, returning to the United States in 1919, where it was demobilized.

The second predecessor of the squadron was the 482d Bombardment Squadron, which was constituted in the Organized Reserve in 1924.  The two units were consolidated in 1936 and, along with other reserve units disbanded in May 1942, shortly after the United States entered World War II.

In 1944, the 482d Bombardment Squadron, Very Heavy was activated and assigned to the 505th Bombardment Group.  Shortly after it was activated, the two 482d Bombardment Squadrons were consolidated.  After serving as a strategic bombing unit in the Pacific with Boeing B-29 Superfortresses, it was inactivated at Clark Field, Philippines in June 1946.

History

World War I
The first predecessor of the squadron was established at Kelly Field, Texas in August 1917 as the 70th Aero Squadron.   While at Camp Morrison, Virginia, the squadron was renumbered along with other construction units as the 482d Aero Squadron.  The squadron was a civil engineering organization at the Western Front constructing airfields and related facilities in the Zone of Advance from its arrival in France in March 1918 until the Armistice on 11 November.   It remained in France until early 1919 when it returned to the United States and was demobilized at Garden City, New York.

Organized reserves
The  482d Bombardment Squadron was organized at Baltimore, Maryland as a reserve unit in March 1925.  It was inactivated in July 1929.  The unit was consolidated with the 482d Aero Squadron in 1936, but remained in inactive status until the end of May 1942, when it was disbanded along with all other Organized Reserve units.

B-29 Superfortress operations against Japan
The second 482d Bombardment Squadron was activated at Dalhart Army Air Field, Texas in March 1944 as a Boeing B-29 Superfortress very heavy bombardment squadron.  The following month, it was consolidated with the reserve squadron that had been disbanded in 1942.  When training was completed moved to North Field (Tinian) in the Mariana Islands of the Central Pacific Area in January 1945 and assigned to XXI Bomber Command, Twentieth Air Force.  Its mission was the strategic bombardment of the Japanese Home Islands and the destruction of its war-making capability.

Flew "shakedown" missions against Japanese targets on Moen Island, Truk, and other points in the Carolines and Marianas.  The squadron began combat missions over Japan on 25 February 1945 with a firebombing mission over Northeast Tokyo.  The squadron continued to participate in wide area firebombing attack, but the first ten-day blitz resulting in the Army Air Forces running out of incendiary bombs. Until then the squadron flew conventional strategic bombing missions using high explosive bombs.

The squadron continued attacking urban areas with incendiary raids until the end of the war in August 1945, attacking major Japanese cities, causing massive destruction of urbanized areas.  Also conducted raids against strategic objectives, bombing aircraft factories, chemical plants, oil refineries, and other targets in Japan. The squadron flew its last combat missions on 14 August when hostilities ended.  Afterwards, its B 29s carried relief supplies to Allied prisoner of war camps in Japan and Manchuria.

Squadron was largely demobilized on Tinian during the fall of 1945.  Remained in Western Pacific, assigned to Twentieth Air Force.  Moved to Clark Field in the Philippines in March 1946. Inactivated at Clark Field on Luzon on June 15, 1946; its low-hour aircraft flown to storage depots in the United States.

Lineage
 482d Aero Squadron
 Organized as the 70th Aero Squadron on 13 August 1917
 Redesignated 482d Aero Squadron (Construction) on 1 February 1918
 Demobilized on 8 February 1919
 Reconstituted and consolidated with the 482d Bombardment Squadron on 2 December 1936

 482d Bombardment Squadron
 Constituted as the 482d Bombardment Squadron on 31 March 1924 and allotted to the reserve
 Activated in March 1925
 Inactivated 23 July 1929
 Consolidated with the 482d Aero Squadron on 2 December 1936
 Disbanded on 31 May 1942
 Reconstituted and consolidated with the 482d Bombardment Squadron, Very Heavy on 21 April 1944

 482d Attack Squadron
 Constituted as the 482d Bombardment Squadron, Very Heavy on 28 February 1944
 Activated on 11 March 1944
 Consolidated with the 482d Bombardment Squadron on 21 April 1944
 Inactivated on 30 Jun 1946
 Redesignated 482d Attack Squadron on 13 February 2018
 Activated on 2 October 2018

Assignments
 Unknown, 15 August 1917 – March 1918
 Advance Section, Service of Supply, March 1918 – December 1918
 Unknown, December 1918 – 8 February 1919
 Allotted to Third Corps Area, 31 March 1924 – 31 May 1942
 347th Bombardment Group, March 1925 – 23 July 1929
 505th Bombardment Group, 11 March 1944 – 30 June 1946
 25th Attack Group, 2 October 2018 – present

Stations
 Kelly Field, Texas, 13 August 1917
 Camp Morrison, Virginia, 21 December 1917 - 4 March 1918
 Colombey-les-Belles Airdrome, France, 27 March 1918
 Autreville Aerodrome, France, 28 March 1918
 Trampot, France, c. 9 July 1918
 Longeaux Aerodrome (Haute-Marne), France, 22 September 1918
 Trampot, France, c. 24 October 1918
 Braux, France, c. 22 November 1918
 Pont Rousseau, 25 December 1918 – unknown
 Garden City, New York, c. 8 – 18 March 1919
 Baltimore, Maryland, c. March 1925 – 23 July 1929
 Dalhart Army Air Field, Texas, 11 March 1944
 Harvard Army Air Field, Nebraska, 12 March – 6 November 1944
 North Field (Tinian), 24 December 1944 – 5 March 1946
 Clark Field, Luzon, Philippines, 14 March – 30 June 1946
 Shaw Air Force Base, South Carolina, 2 October 2018 – present

Aircraft
 Boeing B-17 Flying Fortress, 1944
 Boeing B-29 Superfortress, 1944–1946

See also

 List of American Aero Squadrons

References

Notes
 Explanatory notes

 Citations

Bibliography

External links

Attack squadrons of the United States Air Force